Sandrine Bailly (born 25 November 1979 in Belley, Ain) is a former French biathlete. She was most successful in the 2004–05 season, when she won the overall World Cup, and in the 2007–08 season, when she finished second. In 2003, she became world champion in the 10 km pursuit (together with Martina Glagow).

Career 
Bailly has achieved 20 victories in the Biathlon World Cup, as well as numerous wins on the youth and junior levels. In the 2004–05 season she was the most successful female athlete in the overall World Cup (most points in all events) after placing third in the previous year. She also won the World Cup ranking in the 10 km pursuit discipline. In the 2007–08 season, she finished second in the overall standings and, again, first in the pursuit discipline.

Bailly has won seven medals at the Biathlon World Championships (three in individual events and four in relays). She is well-remembered for winning the pursuit gold medal during the 2003 World Championships in Khanty-Mansiysk, sharing it with German biathlete Martina Glagow as both had exactly the same time on the finish line, a first in biathlon history.

For several years Bailly has also closed out most relays for the French national team. Her greatest success in that discipline was the silver medal in the 4×6 km relay at the 2010 Winter Olympics in Vancouver, British Columbia, Canada.

Bailly retired after the 2009–10 season.

Achievements

Olympic Games
2 medals (1 silver, 1 bronze)

*Pursuit was added as an event in 2002, with mass start being added in 2006.

World Championships
8 medals (1 gold, 2 silver, 5 bronze)

*During Olympic seasons competitions are only held for those events not included in the Olympic program.
**Mixed relay was added as an event in 2005.

World Cup

Individual victories
20 victories (1 In, 9 Sp, 9 Pu, 1 MS) 

*Results are from IBU races which include the Biathlon World Cup, Biathlon World Championships and the Winter Olympic Games.

References

External links
Official website 
 

1979 births
Living people
People from Belley
French female biathletes
Biathletes at the 2002 Winter Olympics
Biathletes at the 2006 Winter Olympics
Biathletes at the 2010 Winter Olympics
Olympic bronze medalists for France
Olympic silver medalists for France
Holmenkollen Ski Festival winners
Olympic biathletes of France
Olympic medalists in biathlon
Biathlon World Championships medalists
Medalists at the 2010 Winter Olympics
Medalists at the 2006 Winter Olympics
Université Savoie-Mont Blanc alumni
Sportspeople from Ain
21st-century French women